Atlantis Resorts, a subsidiary of Kerzner International, is a resort company that was created to operate the Atlantis resorts in Nassau (Bahamas), Dubai (United Arab Emirates), and Sanya (China). Kerzner operates three resorts that include Atlantis The Palm, Dubai; Atlantis Sanya, China; and Atlantis The Royal, Dubai. The Atlantis Paradise Island resort in the Bahamas is no longer owned or operated by Kerzner and is now owned by Brookfield Asset Management LLC and operated by Marriott International's Autograph Collection Hotels.

Aquaventure 
Aquaventure is a large water park with large focus on theming and some attractions not typically found at local water parks. A concept originally introduced for the expansion to the Paradise Island resort complex, Aquaventure is now located at both resorts. The main features of both complexes are The Current, a lazy river-water raft ride hybrid, and the Mayan temple slide tower.

The resorts 
Atlantis Paradise Island, Nassau, Bahamas
Atlantis The Palm, Dubai
Atlantis Sanya, China
Atlantis The Royal, Dubai (opening February 2023)
Atlantis Ko Olina Resort, Hawaii, United States (cancelled)

References 

Seaside resorts in the United Arab Emirates